USS LST-801 was an LST-542-class tank landing ship in the United States Navy. Like many of her class, she was not named and is properly referred to by her hull designation.

History 
LST-801 was laid down on 6 September 1944 at Jeffersonville, Indiana, by the Jeffersonville Boat and Machine Co.; launched on 14 October 1944; sponsored by Miss Jane E. Calhoun; and commissioned on 8 November 1944.

During World War II, LST-801 was assigned to the Asiatic-Pacific theater and participated in the assault and occupation of Okinawa Gunto from March through June 1945. Following the war, LST-801 performed occupation duty in the Far East until early March 1946. She returned to the United States and was decommissioned on 18 July 1946 and struck from the Navy list on 18 August that same year. On 29 December 1947, the ship was sold to Pablo N. Ferrari & Co. for operation, and was transferred to Argentina and renamed Don Antonio.

LST-801 earned one battle star for World War II service.

Argentine service 
In Argentine Navy service, Don Antonio was renamed ARA Cabo Buen Tiempo and redesignated BDT-13 (Buque Desembarco de Tanques).  She was retired in 1963.

References

Bibliography

Notes

External links 
  history.navy.mil: USS LST-801
  navsource.org: USS LST-801

 

LST-542-class tank landing ships
World War II amphibious warfare vessels of the United States
Ships built in Jeffersonville, Indiana
1944 ships
LST-542-class tank landing ships of the Argentine Navy